Uroleucon nigrotuberculatum, the red goldenrod aphid, is a species of aphid in the family Aphididae.

References

Further reading

External links

 

Insects described in 1963
Macrosiphini